László Pataky (24 December 1857, Brád - 4 March 1912, Alvinc) was a Hungarian painter who specialized in rural genre scenes.

Life and work 
He initially studied at the arts and crafts school in Budapest then after 1880, at the Academy of Fine Arts, Munich with Karl von Piloty as his primary instructor. He continued his education in Paris and, from 1883 to 1889, travelled between Paris, Budapest and Munich.

In 1888, he was awarded a scholarship for his painting "The Messenger", which enabled him to study with Mihály Munkácsy. In addition to working in his studio, he helped him create his monumental painting, "Hungarian Conquest", for the Hungarian Parliament Building. When that was completed, he returned to his home province and settled in Alvinc.
 
He provided illustrations for numerous novels, including Marriage Without Love by Carmen Sylva, Giovanni Episcopo by Gabriele D'Annunzio, and The Soul of the Baron by Géza Gárdonyi. Major retrospectives of his work were mounted in 1913, by the Guild of St.George, and 1918 by the Hall of Art. Many of his works are maintained in the collection of the Hungarian National Gallery.

Sources
 Magyar életrajzi lexikon IV: 1978–1991 (A–Z). Ágnes Kenyeres (ed.). Budapest: Akadémiai. 1994.  
 Kieselbach Gallery
 Budapest Aukcio
 Basic data @ the Petőfi Literary Museum

Further reading
 Gyöngy Kálmán: Magyar karikaturisták adat- és szignótára 1848-2007. Karikaturisták, animációs báb- és rajzfilmesek, illusztrátorok, portrérajzolók (Database of Hungarian Illustrators...) Budapest, Ábra Kkt., 2008.
 Szabó Ákos-Kállai Tibor: Magyar festők és grafikusok életrajzi lexikona. Kállainé Virágh Irén, 1997.
 Művészeti lexikon I–IV. Anna Zádor (Ed.), Genthon István. Budapest: Akadémiai. 1981–1983.

External links

1857 births
1912 deaths
Hungarian painters
Hungarian illustrators
Academy of Fine Arts, Munich alumni
People from Brad, Hunedoara